Margot Early (born June 6, 1964) is an American author of mass-market fiction novels. She has published twenty-five titles. Her work has been translated into nine languages and distributed in nineteen countries. Her father was electrical engineer James Early.

References

1964 births
Living people
Place of birth missing (living people)
American women writers
21st-century American women